Marsypophora erycinoides is a moth of the subfamily Arctiinae. It was described by Felder in 1875. It is found in Colombia.

References

 Natural History Museum Lepidoptera generic names catalog

Lithosiini
Moths described in 1875